Tangos North is one of the eighteen barangays (or districts) of Navotas in the Philippines .
It is divided to Tangos North, Navotas and Tangos South, Navotas on 2013.

See also
 Tangos, Navotas

References

Barangays of Metro Manila
Navotas